Delonge or DeLonge is a German surname. Notable people with the surname include:

Franz-Benno Delonge (1957–2007), German board game designer
Franz Josef Delonge (1927–1988), German lawyer and politician
Marco Delonge (born 1966), East German long jumper
Tom DeLonge (born 1975), American singer-songwriter

German-language surnames